Golejów may refer to the following places in Poland:
Golejów, Lower Silesian Voivodeship  (south-west Poland)
Golejów, Rybnik in Silesian Voivodeship (south Poland)